Chamberlain Square  or Chamberlain Place is a public square in central Birmingham, England, named after statesman and notable mayor of Birmingham, Joseph Chamberlain. The Victorian square was drastically remodelled in the 1970s, with most of the Victorian buildings demolished and the construction of the Brutalist Central Library. Re-landscaping occurred most recently when the square was closed to the public for five years until March 2021 for remodelling as part of the Paradise scheme.

Its features include:
Chamberlain Memorial
Birmingham Council House (side elevation)
Birmingham Museum & Art Gallery
Birmingham Town Hall
One and Two Chamberlain Square

Statues and monuments
Chamberlain Memorial - In honour of the public service Joseph Chamberlain gave to the city of Birmingham, the memorial fountain was unveiled in his presence on 10 October 1880 as the centrepiece of the new public square.

and statues of:
Joseph Priestley
James Watt
Thomas Attwood by Sioban Coppinger and Fiona Peever, 1993. The bronze statue sits, having left his plinth, and scattered his bronze pages, on the steps.

The statue of James Watt was originally located on Paradise Street next to the Town Hall. The Joseph Priestley statue was originally located in Victoria Square (then called Council House Square).

The annual Birmingham Christmas Craft Fair is held in Chamberlain Square from the 3rd Friday in November to the 23rd of December. The event began as "Winterval" in 1997/8 (20 November – 31 December), with the intention of attracting business into Birmingham's newly rejuvenated city centre.

Chamberlain Square was the original site of Birmingham's BBC Big Screen, where it was situated until September 2007.

Paradise Circus Development
As part of the Paradise Circus development by Argent Group the square was re-landscaped and surrounding buildings demolished including the brutalist Birmingham Central Library and Paradise Forum (beneath the former reference library). In 2014 landscape architects, Grant Associates were awarded the contract to design the new public realm. The square reopened in March 2021 as the final part of the first phase of the £700m Paradise scheme following its closure in November 2015, the square was transformed with new paving, steps and lighting. Two commercial buildings, One Chamberlain Square and Two Chamberlain Square, totalling 350,000 sq ft of space, now face onto the square and form the commercial part of Phase One of Paradise.

Photo gallery

Sources

Further reading
Pevsner Architectural Guides - Birmingham, Andy Foster, 2005, 

Squares in Birmingham, West Midlands